Nigel Levine (born 30 April 1989) is a British sprint track and field athlete. As well as an impressive sprint talent, Levine made a big impact in his first ever season over 400m in 2007 recording 46.31 and in 2009 reduced that to 45.78. In 2010 he was part of the bronze medal GB 4 × 400 m team at the world indoor championships in Doha and in 2011 he took the coveted European U23 crown as well as being part of the GB 4 × 400 m relay squad.

In 2013, he won an individual silver medal 2013 European Indoor Championships in Gothenburg in the 400 metres, as well as helping the relay team to a gold medal. On 20 November 2018, Levine was given a four-year ban for breaking anti-doping rules.

Accident
On 17 January 2017, Levine was injured in a road accident alongside fellow sprinter James Ellington; the pair "were riding a motorbike when they were struck head on by a car travelling on the wrong side of the road". They were in Tenerife, Spain, undertaking warm-weather training with a group of British sprinters. Both athletes were admitted to hospital and were described on 18 January as "conscious and stable".

International competitions

References

External links

1989 births
Living people
British male sprinters
English male sprinters
Olympic male sprinters
Olympic athletes of Great Britain
Athletes (track and field) at the 2012 Summer Olympics
Athletes (track and field) at the 2016 Summer Olympics
Commonwealth Games gold medallists for England
Commonwealth Games gold medallists in athletics
Athletes (track and field) at the 2014 Commonwealth Games
World Athletics Championships athletes for Great Britain
World Athletics Indoor Championships medalists
European Athletics Championships medalists
European Athletics Indoor Championships winners
British Athletics Championships winners
Black British sportsmen
English sportspeople of Trinidad and Tobago descent
Commonwealth Games competitors for England
Medallists at the 2014 Commonwealth Games